Bolboși is a commune in Gorj County, Oltenia, Romania. It is composed of seven villages: Bălăcești, Bolboasa, Bolboși, Igirosu, Miclosu, Ohaba-Jiu and Valea.

References

Communes in Gorj County
Localities in Oltenia